Agoda.com is an  online travel agency catering primarily to consumers in the Asia-Pacific region, with headquarters in Singapore and operations in Bangkok, Thailand. Agoda facilitates reservations for lodging, flights, ground transportation, and activities. It is a subsidiary of Booking Holdings.

History
Agoda was co-founded in Singapore in 2005 by school friends Michael Kenny and Robert Rosenstein. Kenny had previously launched PlanetHoliday.com and PrecisionReservations.com, which were incorporated into Agoda.

In 2007, Agoda was acquired by Booking Holdings, formerly The Priceline Group.

Agoda launched iOS and Android mobile apps in July 2011.

After Booking Holdings acquired Israel-based startup Qlika in 2014, the Qlika team joined Agoda to automate and scale its marketing systems. In November 2014, the company opened a research center in Tel Aviv.

In May 2016, Booking Holdings acquired Taipei-based startup WooMoo, the creator of POP, a mobile app that focused on prototyping. Its team relocated to Bangkok.

In May 2018, CEO and co-founder Rob Rosenstein became the chairman of Agoda and a strategic advisor to Booking Holdings. John Wroughton Brown, the COO, was promoted as the new CEO of Agoda, with Chief Product Officer Omri Morgenshtern, who joined the company as part of the Qlika acquisition, named as the new COO.

In November 2018, Agoda launched airport transfers via a partnership with Mozio.

In September 2019, Agoda launched a brand refresh including a new logo, custom font, and cartoon mascots called Agojis based on the circles in the logo. 

In October 2019, flight bookings were introduced.

In November 2019, Agoda launched B2B products including a white-label platform.

In May 2020, Agoda announced the layoffs of 1,500 people due to the COVID-19 pandemic.

In June 2022, John Brown left the position of CEO, with then-Chief Product Officer Omri Morgenshtern becoming the new CEO.

Controversies and legal issues
In April 2017, the Tourism Minister of Thailand called for Agoda among others to drop illegal and unregistered hotels. Agoda was the primary company criticized, and its success is part of what led the Ministry of Tourism & Sports to create a competitive hotel booking website. In 2018, Agoda cooperated with the Taipei City Government's request to remove illegal and unregistered Taipei hotels from its listings. Agoda faced legal action from the Turkish Travel Agencies Association due to alleged unfair competition. It faced a potential ban as part of this lawsuit.

In October 2017, Agoda, among other hotel sites, was subject to a probe by the Competition and Markets Authority in the United Kingdom. The probe was related to "concerns about hidden charges, pressure selling tactics, misleading discount claims and the order in which results appear on the site pages." Agoda agreed to change how it operates in response to this probe.

In December 2017, Agoda initially refused to give a refund to a customer that booked a non-existent hotel. Agoda eventually paid a refund following a fraud complaint filed with the Thai government.

In 2018, a customer who booked through the website had items stolen from her hotel room due to poor security. Although online travel agents are not typically liable in such cases, Agoda provided a goodwill refund, however, for legal reasons, the customer's defamatory review was removed from the site. A security consultant discussed how trying to avoid defamation charges in this way could potentially result in fewer negative reviews, or in reviews where negativity was diluted.

In 2019, Agoda was criticized for difficulties with customers removing their homes from the website. The customers cited customer service issues.

References

External links
 

2007 mergers and acquisitions
Booking Holdings
Hotel and leisure companies based in Singapore
Internet properties established in 2003
Online travel agencies
Singaporean brands
Singaporean travel websites
Transport companies established in 2003